Nader Eivazi Khiarak (born 22 February 1975) is an Iranian sprint canoer who competed in the early 2000s. At the 2000 Summer Olympics in Sydney, he was eliminated in the heats of both the K-1 500 m and the K-1 1000 m events.

External links
Sports-Reference.com profile

1975 births
Canoeists at the 2000 Summer Olympics
Iranian male canoeists
Living people
Olympic canoeists of Iran